"Love in the Hot Afternoon" is a song written by Vince Matthews and Kent Westbury, and recorded by American country music artist Gene Watson.  It was released in May 1975 as the second single and title track from the album Love in the Hot Afternoon.  The song reached No. 3 on the Billboard Hot Country Singles chart, becoming his first top 40 and first top 10 hit on that chart. Two years later, American contralto pop music singer Vicki Lawrence released her female version of this song with the gender reversed as a promotional single on Private Stock Records.

In 2010, it was covered by Bonnie "Prince" Billy and Matt Sweeney for the Adult Swim Singles Program.

Chart performance

References

External links
 Vicki Lawrence's female version of this song with lyrics
 https://www.discogs.com/Vicki-Lawrence-Love-In-The-Hot-Afternoon/master/983835

1975 singles
1975 songs
Gene Watson songs
Songs about New Orleans
Capitol Records singles